The 1981–82 Arab Club Champions Cup was the first edition of the Arab Club Champions Cup. The first edition featured three teams, after the withdrawals of Libyan club Al-Ahli Tripoli, Saudi club Al-Nassr and Somali club Horseed.

Iraqi club Al-Shorta were crowned champions after a playoff victory against Lebanese side Al-Nejmeh. Al-Ahli of Jordan were the other team to take part.

Teams
Participants

Withdrawals

Group stage

Group A
Al-Ahli Tripoli withdrew before the start of the tournament. Both matches were held at Amman International Stadium in Amman, Jordan due to the Lebanese Civil War.

Group B
After the withdrawal of Al-Nassr, Horseed were scheduled to travel to Baghdad on 2 February to play Al-Shorta, but Horseed also withdrew from the tournament; therefore, Group B was scratched and Al-Shorta qualified for the final.

Final
Both legs of the final were held at Al-Shaab Stadium in Baghdad, Iraq due to the Lebanese Civil War.

|}

First leg
After Al-Nejmeh's kits and boots did not arrive in Baghdad in time for the first leg, Al-Shorta provided kits and boots to the Al-Nejmeh team to wear for the match. Al-Nejmeh wore red shirts with white shorts and black boots (except for the player Mohammed Hatoum who wore white boots), while Al-Shorta wore green shirts with white shorts and green socks.

Al-Shorta took the lead in the 40th minute; Mahmoud Hussein Mahmoud beat an Al-Nejmeh player on the right wing and sent in a cross which his brother Ali Hussein Mahmoud met with a header, sending the ball over Al-Nejmeh goalkeeper Zain Hashim and into the net. Ali Hussein Mahmoud scored his second goal in the 83rd minute, as he was sent through on goal and netted with a left-footed shot towards the near post from inside the penalty area. The Kuwaiti referee also awarded Al-Shorta a penalty in the match, but it was missed by Ali Hussein Mahmoud, and the match ended 2–0.

Second leg
Al-Nejmeh wore orange shirts, black shorts and orange socks for the second leg, and the Lebanese side took the lead in the first half through Jamal Al-Khatib who got onto the end of a corner delivered by Al-Nejmeh's captain and struck the ball past goalkeeper Raad Hammoudi. Al-Shorta equalised in the first half when Riyadh Nouri bundled the ball over the line after an Al-Nejmeh defender had made a goal-line block. Al-Nejmeh took the lead again in the second half when Hassan Chatila scored with a shot from outside the penalty area, but Al-Shorta brought the game back level and restored their two-goal aggregate advantage when Tariq Abdul-Amir crossed the ball into the box for Salih Radhi to finish.

Al-Nejmeh player Jamal Al-Khatib suffered a dislocated hip during the match, which ended 2–2, therefore making Al-Shorta 4–2 winners on aggregate. Al-Shorta manager Douglas Aziz was presented with the trophy after the game.

Winner

Top goalscorers

References

External links
Al Shorta in the Arab Champions League - Al Shorta website

1982
1981 in Asian football
1982 in Asian football
1981–82 in Iraqi football
1981–82 in Lebanese football